Air Defence Command is a proposed integrated tri-services command of the Indian Armed Forces. The command will be headed by an Indian Air Force officer.

History 
After Bipin Rawat took over as the first Chief of Defence Staff in January 2020, the first thing he proposed was the creation of an integrated military command that will look after the air defence operations of the Indian military. Discussions were held in the Indian military establishment over this and it was decided that a proposal to create such command shall be prepared by June 30, 2020. Work on creating the Air Defence Command was subsequently scheduled to start in 2021.

Organisation 
A three-star officer from the Indian Air Force will head the proposed Air Defence Command. This command will be responsible for the air defence operations of the Indian military. It will integrate all the relevant assets of three branches of the Indian Armed Forces under a single command authority.

See also 

 Chief of Defence Staff (India)
Integrated Theatre Command

References 

Military of India
 Government agencies established in 2020
 Joint military units and formations of India